Karnataka (Govt.) Polytechnic also known as K.P.T., is a polytechnic university in Mangalore, Karnataka state, India.

History
It was established in 1946 in a rented building in Pandeshwar under the Government of Madras State. Since 1954, Polytechnic has started functioning at its present campus in Kadri Hills, Mangalore. There were four main three-year diploma programmes in civil engineering, mechanical engineering, electrical engineering, and automobile engineering at the time of starting. Later, the current courses were supplemented with the diploma programmes in Chemical Engineering, Polymer Technology, Electronics and Communication, and Computer Science. The polytechnic's campus spans 19 acres in total. The institute benefits the public by providing engineering education.
This Polytechnic College is one of the oldest technical colleges in this region. Institute are running 3-year of eight Diploma courses.

Diploma Courses
 Computer science and Engineering
 Electrical and Electronics Engineering
 Mechanical Engineering
 Electronics and Communication Engineering
 Automobile Engineering
 Civil Engineering
 Chemical Engineering
 Polymer Technology

Admission 
Admission on the institute is based on SSLC result. is established by Department of Technical Education Karnataka, in the month of May–June every Year.

CCTEK 
CCTEK provide a training for interested external peoples in,
Computer Training programme
Technical Training
Other Trainings (Karate, Fine arts, Driving classes 2/4 Men/Ladies)
Special Training for ladies (Fashion designing, Garment making, Cutting and stitching, Machine embroi3, Craft training, Herbal beautician)

References 

Universities and colleges in Mangalore
Educational institutions established in 1946
1946 establishments in India
Technical universities and colleges in Karnataka